Gawler is the oldest country town on the Australian mainland in the state of South Australia. It was named after the second Governor (British Vice-Regal representative) of the colony of South Australia, George Gawler. Topographically, Gawler lies at the confluence of two tributaries of the Gawler River, the North and South Para rivers, where they emerge from a range of low hills.

Historically a semi-rural area, Gawler has been swept up in Adelaide's growth in recent years, and is now considered by some as an outer northern suburb of Adelaide. It is counted as a suburb in the Outer Metro region of the Greater Adelaide Planning Region.

History

The Kaurna people are indigenous to the Adelaide Plains. A British colony, South Australia was established as a commercial venture by the South Australia Company through the sale of land to free settlers at £1 per acre (£2/9/5d or £2.47 per hectare). Gawler was established through a  "special survey" applied for by Henry Dundas Murray and John Reid and a syndicate of ten other colonists.

The town plan was devised by the colonial surveyor William Light, and was the only town planned by him other than Adelaide. William Jacob used Light's plans and laid out the town.

Adelaide became a model of foresight with wide streets and ample parklands. After Light's death, it also became a model for numerous other planned towns in South Australia (many of which were never built). As the only other town planned by Light, Gawler is dissimilar to Adelaide's one square mile (2.6 km²) grid; the heart of Gawler is triangular rather than square, a form dictated by the topographical features. The parkland along the riverbanks and a Victorian preference for public squares are present, but Light was aware that he was planning a village, not a metropolis.

Gawler prospered early with the discovery of copper nearby at Kapunda and Burra, which resulted in Gawler becoming a resting stop to and from Adelaide. Later, it developed industries including flour milling by Hilfers & Co, and the engineering works of James Martin & Co manufactured agricultural machinery, mining and ore-processing machinery and smelters for the mines of Broken Hill and the Western Australian goldfields, and steam locomotives and rolling stock. May Brothers & Co. also manufactured mining and agricultural machinery.

With prosperity came a modest cultural flowering, ("The colonial Athens" was its nickname in the late 19th and early 20th centuries), the high point of which was the holding of a competition to compose an anthem for Australia in 1859, four decades before nationhood. The result was the Song Of Australia, written by Caroline Carleton to music by Carl Linger. This became, in the next century, a candidate in a national referendum to choose a new National Anthem for Australia to replace God Save the Queen.

Gawler had a horse street tram service from 1879 to 1931.

Culture
Gawler is a commercial centre for the Mid-North districts of South Australia.

Gawler regularly hosts stages of the annual cycling race, the Tour Down Under.

The annual show, named the Gawler Show, was established in 1856 and is South Australia's largest country show. Show attendances regularly attract an estimated 30,000 people over the weekend. The Gawler Show has won the Gawler Australia Day Award for Community Event of the Year in 2010 and 2017.

The Gawler Police XI (The Gawler Police are one of the oldest stations in Australia, as they have been on Cowan Street, Gawler continuously since 1842 ) play against a Salvation Army All-Stars team made up of local civic and business leaders in an annual community charity cricket match for the Hope Cup  The 2022 Hope Cup match raised more than $40,000 to assist the homeless population in the community.  The match is played at Curdnatta Park (Sandy Creek) which is considered one of the most picturesque cricket grounds in all of South Australia.  The Bunyip Newspaper (The oldest regional newspaper in South Australia), awards the Bunyip Medal to the player in the game who best displays the spirit of the Hope Cup on and off the field. The Hope Cup Cricket Match won the Gawler Australia Day Award for Community Event of the Year in 2023

Transport
Gawler is just over forty kilometres north of Adelaide city centre along Main North Road. Main North Road was the historic road to the Mid North region of South Australia. North of Gawler, the road is now known as the Horrocks Highway. The Sturt Highway runs northeast from the north side of Gawler, leading to Nuriootpa, the Riverland, Mildura and Sydney. The Barossa Valley Way runs east from the centre of Gawler into the Barossa Valley, and was the original route of the Sturt Highway. The Thiele Highway leads north between the Horrocks and Sturt Highways to Freeling, Kapunda and Morgan. The Northern Expressway is a new highway to the southwest providing a bypass of Gawler as part of the North–South Corridor, Adelaide which will eventually provide a non-stop road from south of Adelaide to Nuriootpa.

Gawler railway station was the terminus of the railway from Adelaide from 1857. The railway was extended to Kapunda in 1860. Gawler became a junction station when a branch was constructed into the Barossa Valley in 1911. This is the line that provides the Gawler Oval and Gawler Central (originally named North Gawler) railway stations in Gawler. Gawler Central is now the terminus of the metropolitan rail services from Adelaide.

Gawler's horse-drawn tram service opened in 1879. It operated for both goods and passengers from the railway station along what is now Nineteenth Street (then known as part of Murray Street) and Murray Street (the town's main street) to a terminus near where the Gawler Central station is now. It passed the James Martin & Co engineering factory, providing a convenient way to deliver heavy equipment such as locomotives manufactured there. Broad gauge locomotives were taken directly on the tramway, narrow gauge were transported on specially-built flat-bed trucks. There were also sidings at May Brothers and Company, Roedigers, and Dowson's Mill. The tram closed in 1931 replaced by a bus, and the tracks lifted soon after.

The tram route is now part of Adelaide Metro bus route number 491.

Sport
The Gawler Greyhound Racing Club hold greyhound racing meetings at the Showgrounds on Nixon Terrace. The Club held its first meeting on 12 July 1971.

Notable people

Simon Birmingham, politician
Jack Bobridge, Australian Olympic cycling medallist
Peter Brinkworth, inventor of chicken salt
Lachlan Brook, football player for Brentford F.C
Wes Carr, 2008 Australian Idol winner
Leslie Duncan, politician
Bruce Eastick, politician
Cecil Hincks, politician
Jed Kurzel, singer-songwriter, and film composer
Justin Kurzel, film director
Brenton Langbein, violinist, conductor, and composer
Darren Lehmann, Australian cricketer, was born in Gawler in 1970
Travis Head, Australian cricketer. 
Lyn Lillecrapp, Paralympic swimmer
James Martin, industrialist, politician
Riley McGree, football player for Middlesbrough, Socceroos representative
John McKinlay, explorer
Lisa Ondieki, Long distance runner and Olympic silver medallist
Sonny Morey, National Aboriginal and Torres Strait Islander Sports Award winner and SANFL Indigenous Team of the Century member.

See also
 Town of Gawler (local government)
 List of locomotive builders

References

External links

 Town of Gawler website

Gawler Now and Then

 
Suburbs of Adelaide
Towns in South Australia
1836 establishments in Australia